The 24th Kolkata International Film Festival took place from 10 Nov 2018 – 17 Nov 2018. Celebrating 100 Years of Bengali cinema, Around 171 films and 150 short and documentary films from 70 countries was screened at the festival.

Inauguration 
24th Edition of Kolkata International Film Festival was inaugurated at Netaji Indoor Stadium by West Bengal CM Mamata Banerjee.

Apart from the entire Bengali film industry, Bollywood stalwart Amitabh Bachchan, who has been a regular in the inaugural function of KIFF for the last few years, was also invited this year, along with Shahrukh Khan. Along with them, other nationally famed film personas like Jaya Bachchan, Wahida Rehman, Nandita Das, Mahesh Bhatt were also present.

Themes & Highlights 
The highlight of the festival this year was 100 years of Bengali cinema – fourteen restored Bengali classics and a few contemporary regional language films was screened at Nandan and Rabindra Sadan. The special focus of KIFF this year was on Australia and Tunisia films. Selected contemporary and iconic Australian and Tunisian movies was also screened, along with three retrospective series with films by Majid Majidi, Phillip Noyce and Bimal Roy. Änother category "Unheard India" was showcase eight lesser-known Indian language films from across the country – Sinjar (Jasari), Saakibaayi (Banjaara), Kittath Preeti, Boldu, Navleri, Death Certificate (Bengali), Nabon (Khasi) and Nana A Tale Of Us.

‘Antony Firingee’ starred by Uttam Kumar was chosen as the inaugural movie of the festival . A special theatre play named ‘Hirala Bioscope’ was staged on 13 November. It is based on Hiralal Sen, who is considered to be one of the country's first filmmakers.

Official Selections

Competition Categories

Asian Select (NETPAC Award)

International Competition: Innovation in Moving Images

Competition on Indian Language's Films

Competition on Indian Documentary Films

Non-Competition Categories

100 Years of Bengali Cinema

Bengali Panorama

Cinema International

Documentary Films

Children's Screening

Contemporary Australian Cinema

Iconic Australian Cinema

Great Master: Bimal Roy

Homage: Supriya Devi

Centenary Tribute: Ernst Ingmar Bergman

References 

Kolkata International Film Festival
2018 film festivals